Kiryabinskoye (Kiräbe) is a rural locality (a selo) and the administrative centre of Kiryabinsky Selsoviet, Uchalinsky District, Bashkortostan, Russia. The population was 485 as of 2010. There are 15 streets.

Geography 
Kiryabinskoye is located 38 km northwest of Uchaly (the district's administrative centre) by road. Rysayevo is the nearest rural locality.

References 

Rural localities in Uchalinsky District